Koromači–Boškini is a small settlement in the City Municipality of Koper in the Littoral region of Slovenia.

History
In 1954, when the Free Territory of Trieste was dissolved and Zone B was assigned to Yugoslavia, Koromači–Boškini (together with Abitanti, Belvedur, Brezovica pri Gradinu, Gradin, Močunigi, Pregara, and Sirči) was originally assigned to the Socialist Republic of Croatia. In 1956 these villages were reassigned to the Socialist Republic of Slovenia.

References

External links
Koromači–Boškini on Geopedia

Populated places in the City Municipality of Koper